Summer Love Songs is a 2009 compilation of music by the Beach Boys released through Capitol Records.  The compilation, as the title suggests, is themed around love songs and contains 20 songs recorded from 1963-1970 that fit this theme. Included are new stereo mixes of "Don't Worry Baby", "Why Do Fools Fall in Love" (featuring a never before heard intro), "Hushabye", "I'm So Young", "Good to My Baby" and "Time to Get Alone". Making its CD debut in a revised mix is the song "Fallin' in Love" by Dennis Wilson that was released as the b-side of his "Sound of Free" single in 1970.

The stereo mixes of "Don't Worry Baby" and "Why Do Fools Fall in Love" were made possible by Beach Boys historian Jon Stebbins' discovery of the original multi-track session tapes in the mid-2000s.

Track listing
"Don't Worry Baby"  (Brian Wilson, Roger Christian [1964]) - 2:51
"Why Do Fools Fall in Love"  (Morris Levy, Frankie Lymon [1964]) - 2:35
"Wouldn't It Be Nice"  (B. Wilson, Tony Asher, Love [1966]) - 2:33
"God Only Knows"  (B. Wilson, Asher [1966]) - 2:55
"Surfer Girl"  (B. Wilson [1963]) - 2:28
"California Girls" (B. Wilson, Love [1965]) - 2:47
"Please Let Me Wonder"  (B. Wilson, Love [1965]) - 2:52
"In the Parkin' Lot"  (B. Wilson, Love [1964]) - 2:04
"Your Summer Dream"  (B. Wilson, Bob Norman [1963]) - 2:29
"Kiss Me, Baby"  (B. Wilson, Love [1965]) - 2:43
"Hushabye"  (Doc Pomus, Mort Shuman [1964]) - 2:44
"I'm So Young"  (W.H. Tyrus Jr.[1965]) - 2:34
"Good to My Baby"  (B. Wilson, Love [1965]) - 2:21
"Fallin' in Love" (Dennis Wilson [1970]) - 3:03
"Time to Get Alone" (B. Wilson [1969]) - 2:56
"Our Sweet Love" (B. Wilson, Al Jardine, Carl Wilson [1970]) - 2:40
"Help Me, Rhonda" (B. Wilson, Love [1965]) - 2:48
"Keep an Eye on Summer"  (B. Wilson, Norman [1964]) - 2:23
"Don't Talk (Put Your Head on My Shoulder)" (B. Wilson, Asher [1966]) - 2:58
"Girls on the Beach" (B. Wilson, Love [1964]) - 3:01

References

2009 compilation albums
The Beach Boys compilation albums